The 2012–13 FC Basel season is the 120th season in club history and the club's 18th consecutive season in the top flight of Swiss football. Basel started their season with various warm-up matches against teams from Switzerland, Romania and Germany.  Their 2012–13 Swiss Super League season began on 13 July with the away tie against Servette FC and they started in the 2012–13 Swiss Cup first round on 15 September with the away game against FC Amriswil. Basel entered the Champions League in the qualifying phase and were drawn against Estonian club Flora Tallinn. This and the following qualifying round were overstood, however in the play-off round Basel lost both games against CFR Cluj and were knocked out.

Following a poor start to the season it was announced on 15 October 2012 that Vogel had been replaced by Murat Yakin as manager Following the out in the Champions League Basel played in the Europa League group stage and were drawn into Group G along with Sporting Clube de Portugal, K.R.C. Genk and Videoton FC. They finished the Group in second position and advanced to the knockout phase round of 32. Here they were drawn against the Ukrainian Premier League team Dnipro Dnipropetrovsk. Basel won 3–1 on aggregate. In the round of 16 they were drawn against Zenit St. Petersburg and, despite being the underdogs, Basel advanced by winning 2–1 on aggregate. Thus they qualified for the quarter-finals and were drawn against Tottenham Hotspur, whom they beat 4–1 on penalties after a 4–4 aggregate draw to progress to the semi-finals. The draw for the semi-final matched Basel against the reigning UEFA Champions League holders Chelsea.

Club

FC Basel Holding AG
The FC Basel Holding AG (Holding) owns 75% of the club FC Basel (FC Basel 1893 AG) and the other 25% is owned by the club and its members. Chairman of the Holding was Bernhard Heusler, the finance chief was Stephan Werthmüller and Sportdirector was Georg Heitz. As chairman of the Holding Heusler was also chairman of the club.

Club management
At the AGM the existing board of directors under president Bernhard Heusler with vice-president Adrian Knup, sportdirector Georg Heitz, financial manager Stephan Werthmüller and marketing manager René Kamm, and the three directors Reto Baumgartner, Dominik Donzé and Benno Kaiser were willing to continue as before. They were all re-elected unanimously

Team management 
First team manager at the start on the season was Heiko Vogel. His assistants were Marco Walker and Markus Hoffmann. Massimo Colomba retired as a player and was appointed as the new Goalkeeper coach. Massimo Ceccaroni was appointed as the new head of the FCB Youth System. Coach of the Youth Team (U–21) was Carlos Bernegger and Benjamin Huggel, who also retired as player, was appointed as his new assistant.

On 15 October 2012 it was announced that Vogel had been replaced by Murat Yakin as manager, but that the assistants would all remain in their respective positions. On 7 April 2013 it was announced that Carlos Bernegger was released from his still running contract (that was valid until June 2015) so that he could sign a contract with FC Luzern as first team manager. Bernegger started his new job on 8 April and was replaced ad-interim by the Youth Section boss Ceccaroni.

Overview

Offseason and preseason
Heiko Vogel remained as first team manager. A number of players left the squad. Massimo Colomba retired as a player and was appointed as the new Goalkeeper coach.

Beni Huggel also retired from his active career and became assistant to coach Carlos Bernegger of the U-21 team. Between the years 1998 to 2005 and again from 2007 to 2012 Huggel played a total of 536 games for Basel scoring a total of 102 goals. 297 of these games were in the Swiss Super League, 30 in the Swiss Cup, 74 in the European competitions (Champions League, Europa League and UIC) and 135 were friendly games. He scored 62 goals in the domestic league, 9 in the cup, 8 in the European competitions and the other 23 were scored during the test games. Huggel won the Swiss championship seven times and the cup five times.

Further, Scott Chipperfield retired from his professional career and moved to local amateur club FC Aesch as player-coach. Between the years 2001 and 2012 Chipperfield played a total of 486 games for the club scoring 106 times. 270 of these games were in the domestic league, 37 in the Cup, 78 in the European competitions and 101 were friendly games. He scored 69 goals in the domestic league, 8 in the cup, 8 in the European competitions and the other 21 were netted during the test games. He is the Basel all-time record holder of titles with the club, with seven Swiss Nationalliga A/Super League and six Swiss Cup honours.

Xherdan Shaqiri left the club and signed a four-year contract with Bayern Munich. The transfer fee was not disclosed by the two clubs. Granit Xhaka also left FC Basel and signed a five-year contract with Borussia Mönchengladbach. The clubs did not disclose the transfer fee. It was also announced that Getafe signed David Abraham in a free transfer and gave him a four-year contract.

Basel's biggest signings of the 2012–13 season were Mohamed Salah, who transferred in from Arab Contractors, and Marcelo Díaz, who came from Universidad de Chile. Díaz was transferred to Basel in a US$4 million deal and signed a four-year contract. David Degen also returned to his home club after spending four seasons with BSC Young Boys. Stjepan Vuleta, Simon Grether and Mirko Salvi signed from the youth academy.

Winter break
Basel started the preparation for the second half of the season on 4 January 2013. They played a friendly on 12 January against Bayern Munich and spent their training camp in Marbella from 14 to 24 January. Here they played four trials, the last being the 2–1 win against the Chinese national team.

On 13 December 2012 FC Basel announced that they had signed Serey Die on a three and a half-year contract and on 17 December 2012 they also announced that Endogan Adili had also been signed on a three and a half-year contract, with an additional one-year option. On 3 January 2013 it was announced that Raúl Bobadilla had been signed on a contract until 2017. On 29 January 2013 it was announced that Basel had signed Mohamed Elneny on loan until the end of the season.

In the other direction, it was also announced that Radoslav Kováč was given a free transfer to Slovan Liberec. During January it was also announced that some of the youngsters would be loaned out to lower league clubs, Pak Kwang-Ryong Simon Grether and Pascal Schürpf to Bellinzona, Stjepan Vuleta to Wil and Marco Aratore to Winterthur so that they could all gain playing experience.

The campaign

Domestic league 
Basel's priority aim for the season is to win the league championship for the fourth time in a row. Basel's 2012–13 Swiss Super League season began on 13 July 2012 with the away tie against Servette FC. The season started poorly, Basel won just three of their first nine games, drawing five with one defeat. They were in fourth position in the league table, eight points behind the leaders Grasshoppers, this even increased to eleven points just three weeks later. Following a poor start to the season the club announced on 15 October 2012 that Vogel had been replaced by Murat Yakin as manager and following the  change, the team spirits improved and they played better, achieving the results. FCB ended the first half of the season in second position, they had reduced the arrears to four points and had moved one point ahead of Sion and St. Gallen.

In the second half of the season FC Sion lost their momentum completely and St. Gallen also lost contact to the first two positions in the league table. The Grasshoppers and Basel distanced themselves continually, but remained within a few points of each other. Basel took over the lead in the championship table and, mid-way through the second half of the season, started to open a gap to their last remaining rivals. Despite Grasshoppers winning the direct league fixture against Basel three games before the end of the season, Basel had acquired enough points to finish three points ahead of them and to win their fourth title in a row. Basel thus achieved their main aim that they had set for the season, in fact the league campaign can be described as being a successful one.

Conclusion
Basel thus achieved their main aim that they had set for the season, in fact the league campaign can be described as being a successful one. The team ended the season with 61 goals scored and 31 goals against. They had the season's best attacking as well as the best defensive record. Marco Streller was the team's top goal scorer with 14 goals and he was second in the league top scorer ranking behind Ezequiel Scarione from St. Gallen. Alexander Frei was the team's second-best scorer with seven goals, but the due to injuries he only played in 18 of the league 36 games. Valentin Stocker had scored six league goals and Mohamed Salah had netted five.

Domestic Cup
Basel entered the 2012–13 Swiss Cup in the first round of the competition and as cup holders the club's clear aim for the team was for them to retain the title. In the first round, teams from the Super League and Challenge League were seeded and could not play against each other. In a match, the home advantage was granted to the team from the lower league, if applicable. Basel were drawn with the away game against FC Amriswil, a team from the OFV (Ostschweizer Fussballverband) eastern regional 2. Liga, the sixth tier of Swiss football.

Amriswil (15 September 2012)
Over 5,000 spectators wanted to see how the amateurs from Amriswil would make life difficult for the reigning Swiss champions Basel. But that didn't happen. By the interval it was already 0–4 out of the hosts point of view. Twice a goal from Jacques Zoua and as well as a goal from Fabian Frei and one from Alex Frei had taken the score to this intermediate and had given FCB a nerve-sparing afternoon. Even the consolation goal in the 74th minute could not spoil the visitor's day, because afterwards again Alex Frei and finally Mohamed Salah subsequently increased the score. The Underdogs lost the match against the favourites 1–6.

Chiasso (11 November 2012)
In the second round of the Cup the teams from the Super League were seeded and could not play each other. In the matches the home advantage was granted to the team from the lower league. Basel were drawn against Chiasso, who at that time played in the Challenge League, the second tier of Swiss football. After two days of continuous rain, the Stadio Comunale with just 1,004 paying spectators and with a soggy and deep pitch welcomed the visitors. But the FCB players were ready and without any lead time. Gilles Yapi, who wore the captain's armband because Marco Streller was out injured, launched Mohamed Salah with a long ball and his ideally timed cross found the completely free-standing Fabian Frei at the far post. The Basel team quickly followed up and increased their early lead in the 19th minute to 2–0 with a header from Jacques Zoua after a corner from Marcelo Diaz. The consolation goal sprang from a Basel corner kick, which was played shortly. Yapi's shot was blocked and the home team conjured up a perfectly played counterattack. Captain Sandro Reclari sent Luis Filipe Pimenta running with a long ball. The Portuguese sprinted from the centre line, out-running defender Joo Ho Park, and artfully lifted the ball from 15 meters over Germano Vailati into the goal. After the break, an FCB, who was vastly superior in all respects, nailed the opponent to his penalty area. Salah and twice Diaz still missed good chances, but then with a double strike in the 65th and 67th minute the match was decided. First Salah played Fabian Frei into space, keeper Andrea Capelletti could not hold his shot, and Zoua rounded the Chiasso goalie and pushed home from an acute angle. The fourth goal was initiated by Marcelo Diaz with a pass to Salah. The Egyptian saw his shot blocked, but Diaz inherited the ricochet and shot in from ten yards. The 4–1 score line remained until the final whistle.

Locarno (9 December 2012)
In the third round, the ties were drawn, there was no seeding, everyone could meet everyone. The home advantage was granted to the team from the lower league, otherwise to the team that was drawn first. Basel were drawn, again away from home, against Locarno. Basel took control of the game from the beginning. In the fifth minute corner for Basel, Jacques Zoua heads the ball, goalie Mitrović landed in the goal, but held the ball on the line. Eighth minute a cross from Alexander Frei and Mohamed Salah kicked the ball into the net. The goal was disallowed because the ball had passed over the line before the cross had been made. Basel were completely in control of the game, but Salah, Frei, Zoua and Fabian Schär missed their chances. Shortly before the interval Salah eventually got his goal, sent into the middle on a sprint with a long ball, he used the outside of his left boot to put the ball home. In the second period Nicolás Mazzola on 51 minutes levelled the score and double strike just four minutes later put the home team in front. Salah also managed a double pack, in the 75th minute he levelled the score. Basel should have decided the tie with their numerous chances earlier, but extra time was needed to decide the tie. Valentin Stocker did this by scoring the winner in the 117th minute. Locarno were knocked out by Basel, 2–3 being the final score.
 
Thun (27 February 2013)
The winners of Round 3 played in the quarter-finals and these were played in the new year. The ties were drawn, there is no home advantage granted in the draw. Basel were drawn away from home against FC Thun. Head coach Murat Yakin had changed the team significantly compared to their last game Six players were left out, Schär, Park, Cabral, Stocker and Streller were given a day off, Fabian Frei and Salah initially sat on the bench. Less than twelve minutes had passed in the Arena Thun, which was almost embarrassingly empty for a Cup quarter-final, when Alexander Frei was present for the first FCB chance. Newcomer Mohamed Elneny launched Philipp Degen with a great ball and as his cross came Frei cleverly ran free to head home. Basel controlled the game, created chances but did not succeed to add a goal. In the second period they limited themselves to managing the result and promptly they conceded the equalizer in the 79th minute. After a corner kick, Mathieu Salamand, who had just been substituted in seconds before, was able to bring the ball to the middle, where FCB goalie Yann Sommer did not react and Marco Schneuwly was able to nod home from four meters out. After this shock, Basel pulled themselves together, found their way back into the game and in the in extra time they dominated. Salah missed a first big chance in the 93rd minute when he sprinted with the ball past the Thun goalkeeper, but then also past the goal. FCB had to bite until the 115th minute, before they scored the second, decisive goal. Initiated nicely by Marcelo Diaz and processed even better by Fabian Frei down the right wing, Alex Frei scored with a direct volley from five meters.

Sion (17 April 2013)
Basel's opponents in the semi-final were FC Sion. The match was played in front of an attendance of 13,800 fans which meant that the Stade Tourbillon was virtually sold out. Both teams started on eye level with each other and chances were rare happenings. In the 50th minute Marco Streller ran onto a long ball played by Mohamed Elneny to the far side of the far post, goalkeeper Andris Vaņins and defender Vilmos Vanczák both went to challenge him, but broke off their runs because they thought the ball would go out. However, Streller got his boot to the ball before it crossed the outline, passed it to Valentin Stocker whose angled shot missed the target by a hair's width. On 64 minutes a long pass to Sion's striker Michael Dingsdag, but his first-time volley in the sprint from outside the box was saved by Yann Sommer at full stretch. Stocker scored the decisive 1–0 after a cross from Streller a quarter of an hour before the end. Basel achieved the first ever win against Sion in the Cup.

Grasshopper Club (20 May 2013)
The cup final was held on Whit Monday in the Stade de Suisse, Wankdorf with referee Stéphan Studer and with an attendance of 27,290 fans. Both teams started on eye level with each other, playing hard but not unfair. Chances out of the game were hardly possible, but standard situations brought danger. A free-kick for GC in the 38th minute was the first big chance, Steven Zuber’s long ball was side footed at goal by Milan Vilotić, but Yann Sommer stretched and saved brilliantly. GC controlled the game before the interval, a long ball and Shkëlzen Gashi ran into the open space, but he put the ball wide of the far post. After the break a yellow card, that could also have been a red, for Basel defender Aleksandar Dragović, another free-kick for Zuber and this time it was the cross-bar that denied Vilotić the opener. In the 69th minute FCB captain Streller is substituted out because of an injury and new striker Raúl Bobadilla was brought in. Two minutes later he out dribbled two defenders but fell and as he fell Markus Steinhöfer took over the ball and shot at goal and FCB took the lead. GC reacted immediately a shot from Michael Lang was blocked by Sommer, but Izet Hajrović put the loose ball over the goal line. Extra time was required and both teams could have scored, but Nassim Ben Khalifa at one end and Bobadilla at the other failed. Penalty shoot-out. With four penalties taken things were level 3–3. Last penalty for Basel, Bobadilla hit – the crossbar instead of the goal, then Milan Vilotic hit the goal – instead of the crossbar – and it was all over. The Grasshoppers were cup winners.

Conclusion
As cup holders the club's clear aim for the team was for them to retain the title. They had completed their aim of reaching the final, but the penalty shoot-out had denied the absolute fulfilment. Alex Frei was the team's top scorer in the competition with five goals in the games. Jacques Zoua had scored four in four outings and Mohamed Salah had scored three in five outings.

Champions League
Because Basel entered the Champions League in the qualifying phase their initial aim was to reach the group stage.

Flora Tallinn (17 July 2012)
Basel were drawn against Estonian club Flora Tallinn in the second qualifying round. The first leg was played in the A. Le Coq Arena in Tallinn in front of 3.123 fans. It was a partially cloudy evening, the temperature was by 19 °C and the pitch was dry. Basel started well into the match and took control of the game and had more possession than the Estonian champions. However, the best chance in the early stages came from the hosts, but Karl-Eerik Luigend's good cross was shot over the cross-bar by Karl Mööl. Alex Frei had his first chance a few minutes later, but his close-range shot was well saved by Stanislav Pedõk. In the second period Frei first struck on 64 minutes, as he applied the finishing touch to a right-wing cross from David Degen. He then added another three minutes before the final whistle, from a spot-kick, after Karl Palatu had fouled Valentin Stocker.

Return match (24 July 2012)
The second leg was played in the St. Jakob-Park in front of 20,467 fans. Referee Artur Soares Dias from the Portuguese Football Federation reported a dry and good pitch, it was sunny and warm 29 °C evening. Basel started well and with tempo, the visitors struggled to impose themselves on the game. Basel missed their first good chance, but on 9 minutes Jacques Zoua was able to put them one up. Markus Steinhöfer played David Degen free on the right flank and his good cross to the centre was headed home by a free standing Zoua. With Marcelo Díaz distributing the balls in midfield, Basel continued to play forwards and were seeing no danger to their rear, goalie Germano Vailati had a quiet evening. On 31 minutes after a neat move and a one-two with captain Marco Streller, Zoua managed his second goal of the evening. The visitors never really got into the game and went further behind on 63 minutes. A long distance free-kick was smashed home directly by mid-fielder Díaz to make it 3–0, which remained until the final whistle.

Molde (1 August 2012)
Basel were drawn against Norwegian club Molde FK in the third qualifying round. The first leg was in the Aker Stadion with an attendance of 6,564 fans. Basel's head coach Heiko Vogel had to adapt his team, because striker Alex Frei was injured, Basel played with a five-man midfield. Nevertheless, they started well and were quick to take ball possession against the Norwegian champions. In the 10th minute a long opening ball from Goalie Sommer and captain Marco Streller headed on to Valentin Stocker who out-dribbled two defenders, but put the ball wide of the far post. On 15 minutes Marcelo Díaz hammered a direct free-kick at goal, but keeper Espen Bugge Pettersen stretched and was able to push the ball wide. Molde coach Ole Gunnar Solskjær saw his side have their first big chance moments later, Angan was sent down the right by a long ball but his superb volley was well saved by Yann Sommer. A few minutes later Angan struck his hand in Aleksandar Dragović's face and was shown a straight red card by referee Fredy Fautrel of the French Football Federation. The hosts then found themselves back pedalling as Basel took charge. In the second half Basel found it hard to create goal chances against the tightly sorted defence and when they did, their efforts didn't pay dividends. But then on 78 minutes Stocker received the ball, dummied the defender and hit a precise shot towards goal, keeper Pettersen parried the ball and Jacques Zoua sprinted in to kick the loose ball over the line. The 1–0 scoreline remained until the end.

Return match (8 August 2012)
The second leg was in the St. Jakob-Park and on this sunny evening the attendance was 18,567 fans. In the early stages the visitors showed their intentions and pinned Basel back into their own half. Molde FK created their first good chance on 9 minutes as Jo Inge Berget played a quick one-two playing Mattias Moström clear in the box, but Sommer held his shot. A further one-two between Berget and Moström on 14 minutes sent Moström through towards goal but he placed his shot wide of the far post. David Degen had Basel's first good chance on 28 minutes as he ran into position collecting a long ball from Gilles Yapi, but he shot wide. Ole Gunnar Solskjær’s team were rewarded for their superiority in the 32nd minute, a mistake in midfield, a slick move forward and after Magne Simonsen's first shot was parried by Sommer, the rebound fell to Berget who slotted home. After the interval the match changed, Basel found a higher gear and took control. First Valentin Stocker side-footed David Degen's cross off target. Then Degen had a shot blocked in the 63rd minute, he collected the rebound but shot wide. Marcelo Díaz was the next to miss the target and Marco Streller headed over the crossbar. Having spent much of the first period playing forwards, suddenly Molde were happy to sit back and wait for counterattacks. But this was a dangerous tactic, because Basel achieved that goal they were looking for. Diaz with the cross in the 75th minute, Streller headed the ball down for Degen and he pushed it home not savagely but with sense 1–1. But it wasn't finished yet, second minute of added time Gastón Sauro pulled his opponent over inside the penalty area. Referee Vladislav Bezborodov of the Russian Football Union had no choice spot-kick. If it was converted Molde would go through, but Sommer correctly guessed which side, dived to his right and saved from Hoseth. The Norwegian champions were demoted to the UEFA Europa League, Basel advanced to the play-off round.

CFR 1907 Cluj (21 August 2012)
In the play-off round Basel were drawn against the Romanian champions CFR Cluj and the first leg was played in the St. Jakob-Park with an attendance of 16,651 fans. Referee was Jonas Eriksson of the Swedish Football Association. Basel started well, their moves were reasoned and the passes well timed. The visitors, however, created the first good chance, Basel keeper Sommer had to stretch following a fierce 25-metre shot from Modou Sougou. Instantly Basel reacted. Mohamed Salah sprinted down the right wing and his curving cross was met by Marco Streller, but his glanced header went wide. Salah then found David Degen with a good pass, but he fired his shot straight at keeper Mário Felgueiras. Five minutes later again Salah with a cross, this time Valentin Stocker shot wide. CFR had their second chance after about 40 minutes, but Pantelis Kapetanos shot over the top. The goal that Basel had threatened came one minute before the interval. A corner-kick from Marcelo Díaz's was diverted into Streller's path and with an acrobatic volley he hit the ball beyond keeper Felgueiras. The second period began as the first half did, Basel took the initiative. Sent down the right by Díaz, David Degen crossed for Stocker, whose short-range firm header was punched out by Felgueiras who reacted fast. However, the home team were caught shortly after the hour, Rafael Bastos’s through ball to Sougou was well timed and his right-foot finish landed low in the net. Five minutes later Gabriel Mureșan sent Sougou running free again and this time he lashed his shot into the roof of the net to put Basel 1–2 down. Basel could not react and the score line remained until the end.

Return match (29 August 2012)
The second leg was played at Stadionul Dr. Constantin Rădulescu with an attendance of 15,481 fans. FCB needed to score twice as a minimum requirement and this was not helped by the fact that head coach Heiko Vogel had to replace midfielder Mohamed Salah because of injury. Nevertheless, the experienced duo Marco Streller and Alexander Frei were always a danger for the host's defence. Frei had the first good chance, but his curling shot floated over the bar. CFR had no intention of sitting back, despite conceding the majority of possession, they were always dangerous with counter-attacks and in the 20th minute a quick counter was finished off by Pantelis Kapetanos header from Diogo Valente’s cross. Basel reacted and took the initiative. Shortly before the interval advancing goalie Mário Felgueiras brought down Streller and referee Gianluca Rocchi from the Italy was forced to award a penalty. But Frei hit the spot-kick over the top. In the second period FCB refused to surrender, but despite all their hard work, they struggled to create clear chances. Substitute Cabral came closest with a 20-metre strike, but at full stretch the home goalkeeper pushed the ball round the post. Later following a corner, defender Aleksandar Dragovic narrowly missed the target with his header. But CFR held their 1–0 lead to win 3–1 on aggregate.

Conclusion
Basel entered the 2012–13 UEFA Champions League in the qualifying phase and therefore their initial aim was to reach the group stage. Having lost both games against CFR Cluj and being knocked out 3–1 on aggregate the initial aim was failed.

Europa League
Because the losing teams from the Champions League play-off round were eligible for the group stage of the Europa League, Basels next aim was to remain in this European competition over the winter break. The draw for the group stage was held on 31 August 2012, 13:00 CEST, at Grimaldi Forum in Monaco. FCB was seeded into pot two and drawn into Group G along with Sporting Clube de Portugal, K.R.C. Genk and Videoton FC.

Group stage
Sporting CP (29 August 2012)
Matchday 1 gave FCB an away game at Estádio José Alvalade in Lisbon against Sporting CP. Sporting had been placed in third position in the 2011–12 Primeira Liga, but this season they started badly into the domestic league and were fifth-last in the table. Although the two teams had met against each other four times in less than five years, this evening did not follow the pattern of recent meetings. Sporting had won all four previous meetings without conceding a single goal, but they entered into this game quite slowly. Basel started better. On 22 minutes a long diagonal free-kick from Alex Frei found Aleksandar Dragovic who ran in unnoticed at the far post with precision timing but he headed the ball inches wide. Ricky van Wolfswinkel was in his typically lively mood and just before the interval he almost put Sporting in front as he connected to André Carrillo's perfect pass and he hit a fierce shot at goal, but Sommer held the ball well. After the goalless first period, Xandão was shown a direct red card in the 50th-minute. Sporting stood back, but compact in the defensive area. On 55 minutes a thunderous drive from Marcelo Díaz some 40 metres out skimmed off the crossbar with captain and goalkeeper Rui Patrício beaten. Striker Van Wolfswinkel was an increasingly isolated figure, but with 15 minutes left he controlled the ball skilfully with his chest, however, his shot was not good enough to bother goalie Sommer. Ten-man Sporting CP held onto a 0–0 draw against FC Basel 1893.

Genk CP (4 October 2012)
Matchday 2 was played in the St. Jakob-Park against Genk on a wet pitch, on a cloudy early evening, in front of 14,023 supporters. The first period belonged completely to the visitors, apart from one opportunist effort from Valentin Stocker. Genk's opening goal was somewhat lucky, Benjamin De Ceulaer hit a pass between the defenders for Jelle Vossen who slid in with his boot stretched out, goalie Sommer rushed out to block the shot, but Vossen could not connect to the ball, which then slid beyond both of them and rolled into the goal. After half an hour De Ceulaer almost added a second with a good shot, but was denied. He then returned to his role as play-maker and with a stylish back-heel he set up Vossen who finished off from the middle of the penalty area just before the break. Seconds later, Alexander Frei should have pulled one back with a point-blank header, but it wasn't his lucky day and the visitors led by two goals as the whistle for half-time came. After the break Basel pressed forward trying to get back into the game, but lacked creative chances. Then 20 minutes from the end, as time and ideas were running out, Kalidou Koulibaly was judged by referee Bülent Yıldırım of the Turkish Football Federation to have lifted his foot too high in the penalty area against midfielder Stocker, who might well have taken on the ball with his arm. Nevertheless, Yıldırım blew his whistle and awarded Basel the spot-kick, which Streller then converted. Basel were electrified, played a gear higher, and were awarded with the equaliser five minutes from time as Streller headed home a corner kick from Stocker to the end score 2–2. Basel were the better team on the night and deserved the point, but they were lucky that things ended as it did.

Videoton (25 October 2012)
The Sóstói Stadion in Székesfehérvár was the venue for matchday 3 in which Videoton were hosts to FC Basel 1983 in front of 8,500 spectators. Not even two minutes had been played as the visitors fell behind. Videoton's right-back Álvaro Brachi's made a cross to the near-post cross, midfielder Nemanja Nikolić put Basel's defender Fabian Schär under pressure and he unintentionally deflected the ball into his own net. Basel were shocked, but they put themselves together and showed first reactions. On 11 minutes Marcelo Díaz played a free-kick to the far post and the unmarked Marco Streller forced goalie Mladen Božović to make a good save. Minutes later he controlled a poor clearance with his chest and shot left footed fiercely but wide. In the 32nd minute Videoton played a corner-kick short and low, Nikolić played the ball diagonally into the goal area, the Basel defence stood and watched as Marco Caneira moved in to put the ball into the net from short distance. The visitors pulled themselves together again and dominated play. A cross from the right was punched away by the host's goalie Božović, but only to Schär, however his first-time volley went inches wide. The host's goalie stayed alert and denied Valentin Stocker's sharp back-heel effort and then denied Streller yet again. After the break the same methods of play, Basel had the bigger share of possession and dominated, Videoton stood back and waited for counter-attacks. Streller failed to beat Božović after a through ball from Valentin Stocker and failed to beat him again after a corner. Basel's 15th corner in the 91st minute eventually brought the consolation goal, Schär jumped highest to head Fabian Frei's kick into the top corner. The Videoton defence held tight in the final few hectic moments for the 2–1 home win.

Videoton (8 November 2012)
The requirements were clear as it came to matchday 4 in the St. Jakob-Park.  Genk were group leaders with seven points, Videoton second with six, Basel had just two and with another defeat they would be out.  As referee Yevhen Aranovskiy of the Football Federation of Ukraine blew the whistle for Kick-off the temperature had fallen to just 6 °C and this was probably the reason why only 12,743 spectators were present in the St. Jakob-Park. The home team dominated the first period and only their keeper Mladen Božović kept Videoton in the game before the break. The keeper twice foiled Alexander Frei from close range, first he parried a header following Philipp Degen's cross and later he blocked an instinctive effort after a Streller knock-down. Božović best save of the evening was in the 22nd minute as he turned Streller's point-blank header away with a strong right hand. After the restart Paulo Sousa's team focused with their defensive tactics on suffocating the Basel attacking efforts. Streller rounded Paulo Vinícius, but sliced wide as he created himself a rare opportunity. Murat Yakin's team remained concentrated and patient and the Basel captain made no mistake when the next chance came his way. Streller controlled Mohamed Salah's pass, resisted the defenders and crashed his effort inside the left post from the edge of the box. This 1–0 was decisive, it lifted Basel to within a point of Videoton and just a win adrift of leaders Genk, who drew 1–1 with Sporting in the other game.

Sporting (22 November 2012)
Referee Paolo Valeri of the Italian Football Federation was in charge of the matchday 5 tie between Basel and Sporting CP in the St. Jakob-Park with an attendance of 15,666 spectators. Basel made a lively start. David Degen's fierce drive in the 10th minute forced the first notable save from Rui Patrício. On 22 minutes Valentin Stocker played a neat pass into the box, Alexander Frei and Xandão slid in to contest for the ball and as it broke loose Fabian Schär slotted in from close range. Five minutes later a good distance shot from Marcelo Díaz went very close. Sporting reacted immediately, after a defensive mistake by Schär, Ricky van Wolfswinkel forced Yann Sommer to make an impressive save. At the beginning of the second half Sporting captain Elias shot close, but wide from the edge of the box. Two bookable offences within four minutes by Cabral brought Basel into a numerical disadvantage. Coach Murat Yakin responded by substituting Mohamed Salah in for Alexander Frei. Within two minutes this showed an impact. On 66 minutes Salah made a skilful exchange of passes with Stocker who scored and this gave the team breathing space. Five minutes later a long throw out from keeper Sommer sent Salah sprinting down the left on a counterattack. Salah kept his nerve and played to the middle to David Degen, who scored the third from 12 metres out. This sealed the 3–0 victory for ten-man Basel.

Genk CP (6 December 2012)
Matchday 6, the final round of the group stage, was played in the Cristal Arena against Genk in front of an attendance of 11,974 fans. The temperature had fallen to below freezing point as referee Mark Clattenburg from the Football Association blew the whistle for kick-off and he reported a wet pitch on a cloudy evening. The requirements were clear, Genk were already guaranteed a place in the knockout phase. Basel needed a positive result to advance a victory would take them through above this evening's opponents as table leaders. Murat Yakin's men had more possession and controlled the match from the early stages. Fabian Frei and Marco Streller were in very good form on the day and led their team to attacking play. Frei had the first chance, but was denied from close range. The hosts had their first chance on 30 minutes a pass back from the goal line to the middle was pushed away by diving keeper Yann Sommer before it reached the free standing Glynor Plet. A free-kick from Valentin Stocker on 40 minutes was headed goalwards by Fabian Schär, but goalkeeper László Köteles stretched acrobatically tip the ball over the bar. After the break the match followed the same pattern and after two minutes a cross from the right was knocked by Streller into David Degen's path, but he volleyed wide. On 56 minutes Streller latched onto a through ball, but shot from a very narrow angle struck the left post. However, until final whistle neither team were able to make the finishing touch and the match remained goalless.

Conclusion to group stage
Basel started poorly into the group stage, drawing away against Sporting CP and at home to Genk and then were defeated in Székesfehérvár by Videoton. However, following the management change in October, the team spirits improved and they played better. The two home games against Videoton and against Sporting were ended with victories and lifted the team's spirits even more. The goalless draw to the end of the group stage meant Genk were group winners with 12 points and Basel also advanced to the knock out stage as second placed team with nine points. "And that, even though I took over the team in a difficult phase in the Europa League," said coach Murat Yakin with satisfaction, "that's why I want to congratulate my team." Since the team's first participation in the Champions League in the 2002/03 season, the club has now been over wintered in a European Cup competition for the seventh time. The club hat set the team the aim of remaining in the European competition over the winter break and they achieved their aim positively

Knockout phase
The knockout phase involved 32 teams: the 24 teams that finished in the top two in each group in the 2012–13 UEFA Europa League group stage and the eight teams that finished in third place in the 2012–13 UEFA Champions League group stage. In the draw for the round of 32, the twelve group winners and the four better third-placed teams from the Champions League group stage were seeded, and the twelve group runners-up and the other four third-placed teams from the Champions League group stage were unseeded. A seeded team is drawn against an unseeded team, with the seeded team hosting the second leg. Teams from the same group or the same association could not be drawn against each other. The draws was held at UEFA headquarters in Nyon. Basel were drawn against group F winners Dnipro Dnipropetrovsk.

Dnipro (14 February 2013)
The first leg was held at the St. Jakob-Park in front of 8,314 fans, which was by far the lowest attendance in their own stadium during the club's entire season. Before kick-off the pitch was green and reported as damp on this cloudy evening. Dnipro began the match with an attacking endeavour that had become familiar from them during the group stage, in which the team had achieved 16 goals. Following a long ball Nikola Kalinić shot off target from short range after just 30 seconds. A few minutes later a free kick for the visitors, referee Svein Oddvar Moen of the Football Association of Norway and his linesman over saw that five Dnipro players were offside, but Yevhen Konoplyanka misjudged his angles with his final shot. Basel grouped themselves and won control in midfield. A long throw-in was played longer by Marco Streller, but Valentin Stocker was too small in the duel for the header which was cleared too short, Cabral headed at goal from just inside the box, the ball was trapped by Stocker and he stylishly swept it past Jan Laštůvka from six metres out, 23 minutes gone. By this time the snow fall had started. On the half hour Fabian Frei collected a loose ball and took aim, but his effort was held by Laštůvka. On 44 minutes the hosts came out of a horror scene unscathed. Roman Zozulya stretched his leg into the path of a low cross from Konoplyanka at the near post, only for Yann Sommer to block the ball out for a corner. After the break the snow stayed, the pitch turned white and the ball was now orange. The hosts were still in charge, despite the visitors substituting new forwards in. On 14 February nobody could deny it would be Valentin's day. On 67 minutes an exactly placed left-footed corner-kick from Stocker was deflected into the net off the fore head of striker Streller. Dnipro could not react to this and Valentin Stocker had led the hosts to a deserved 2–0 victory.

Return match (21 February 2013)
With temperatures at freezing point 26,501 fans filled the Dnipro Arena in Dnipropetrovsk as referee Deniz Aytekin from the German Football Association blew the whistle for kick-off. Basel started well and as Mohamed Salah sprinted clear on six minutes he could have put the visitors ahead. He lifted the ball over the out rushing Jan Laštůvka, but his effort landed narrowly wide of the far post. Juande Ramos's team improved their game after that, but they could never really threaten their opponent's goal. Roman Zozulya hat a perfect half-volley on the run, but this flew into the side netting. Yevhen Seleznyov had a chance, but he hooked the ball over the goal from short range just before the interval. After the break, following a free-kick, which Yann Sommer had parried, Giuliano’s goalbound effort deflected off Fabian Schär's boot to safety with the keeper beaten. Things suddenly looked bad for Dnipro, because within ten minutes of coming on as substitute Nikola Kalinić was dismissed for putting his hand into Schär's face. 12 minutes later Fabian Frei also saw red because he raised his arm to block a Zozulya shot. Seleznyov converted the subsequent spot-kick on 76 minutes, but he messed up his next chance with only the goalie to beat. Minutes later at the other end Zozulya blocked Valentin Stocker in the penalty area and was penalised, Schär stepped up to beat the goalie with the penalty-kick, a low ball to Laštůvka's left, on 81 minutes. The game ended with this 1–1 draw and Basel advanced to the next round. The team's aims were subsequently revised again and this aim was stated as reaching the quarter-finals.

Zenit (7 March 2013)
Basel started the first leg of their round of 16 match against Zenit St. Petersburg at home in the St. Jakob-Park in front of an attendance of 15,008 fans. The home team started well and with a high tempo, especially Serey Die with a slaloming run, only to be halted by a good smothering save from keeper Vyacheslav Malafeev. Also impressive was Mohamed Salah his full-blooded drive from 15 metres went very close and next he fired a volley also narrowly close, but off-target. Zenit with their experienced line-up found their way into the game. Diving in at the rear post to collect a Nicolas Lombaerts pass, Roman Shirokov came closest to registering an away goal. before the interval. After the break Zenit became more intent, Danny threatened at the start with an effort that was deflected behind. Axel Witsel pass to Hulk laid off for Shirokov, but a big save from Yann Sommer as he rushed out to smother the danger. Basel played patiently, but concentrated, and 12 minutes from time Alexander Frei was substituted in. On 83 minutes a pass from Markus Steinhöfer to the never tiered Salah, dribble, shot, but parried by keeper Vyacheslav Malafeev the loose ball rolled out to Marcelo Díaz who put it home. Salah had another chance on 90 minutes as Malafeev parried a shot from Mohamed Elneny, but Salah hammered the rebound over the bar. In added time again Salah on a solo run down the left wing was brought down by Luís Neto in the penalty area. Referee Daniele Orsato from the Italy had no choice, showed Neto red and awarded a penalty. Alex Frei converted to the 2–0 scoreline and this left the Russian champions with a sizeable task in the second leg.

Return match (14 March 2013)
The second leg of the tie with Zenit was held in the Petrovsky Stadium in Saint Petersburg and attracted an attendance of 19,500 spectators. Both teams started well, but Zenit gave an early indication that they intended to turn the result in their favour. However, on 11 minutes Valentin Stocker had the first chance, but he shot too high. Stocker remained dangerous, but as he went into a duel with Aleksandr Kerzhakov he received an elbow in his face. The Zenit midfielder was shown the yellow card, but Stocker's injury meant he could not continue and he was replaced by Fabian Frei. After half an hour Hulk played a corner-kick from the right to the near post, the ball was flicked on by Nicolas Lombaerts and Axel Witsel headed home. Two bookable offences within three minutes by Marcelo Díaz just before the interval brought Basel into a numerical disadvantage. After the break Basel had the first chance as Mohamed Salah sent Mohamed Elneny through with a good pass. Elneny sprinted in, but the angle was too acute and the ball went into the side netting. Murat Yakin's team played the second period with 10 men under pressure. Danny missed the best chance as he chipped over from three metres out, Vladimir Bystrov's shot bounced back off the post and Hulk's effort from 25 metres went a fraction over the cross-bar. Five minutes from time Park Joo-Ho attempted to make a clearance, but his boot hit Bystrov's leg. Referee Paweł Gil of the Polish Football Association had no choice but to award the penalty kick. Yann Sommer saved Roman Shirokov's 86th-minute spot-kick and this took his team through to the quarter-finals 2–1 on aggregate.

Tottenham Hotspur (4 April 2013)
In the quarter-finals Basel were drawn against Tottenham Hotspur. The first leg was played in the White Hart Lane in London and attracted an attendance of 32,136 fans. Referee was Milorad Mažić of the Football Association of Serbia. Basel started fast and furious, Fabian Schär and Marco Streller both had powerful efforts saved by Spurs keeper Brad Friedel, then Markus Steinhöfer volleyed a fraction over the top. After 24 minutes the hosts lost Aaron Lennon due to an injury. After half an hour the visitors took the lead as Valentin Stocker reacted fastest following Streller's attempt bounced back off a post. Four minutes later Fabian Frei doubled up as he put a diving header into the net low beyond the goalie. Another six minutes later Emmanuel Adebayor pulled one back with a volley from close range following Scott Parker's deflected shot. The second half initially followed a similar pattern and after Mohamed Salah was foiled by the Spurs keeper, Kyle Naughton drew a fine save from Basel keeper Yann Sommer. Tottenham managed to pull level as Gylfi Sigurðsson beat Sommer with a half-volley from 22 yards that took a deflection off defender Schar. Basel worked hard to regain the lead both Salah and Jacques Zoua wasted best chances and Stocker went very close with a direct free-kick. Spurs held on, but in added time Gareth Bale was carried off with an ankle injury that would also keep him out in the second leg.

Return match (11 April 2013)
In the second leg, the St. Jakob-Park with 36,500 spectators was sold out, and the referee was Olegário Benquerença of the Portuguese Football Federation. The rainy weather did not spoil anybody's fun until the 23rd minute as Aleksandar Dragović slipped out on the wet pitch and missed the ball as he attempted to cut off a Vertonghen through ball and this allowed Clint Dempsey to round beyond keeper Yann Sommer and side-foot into the ball into the open goal. The home supporters, however, increased their volume and urged their players on. Park Joo-Ho intercepted a pass, Marco Streller took over and played a simple ball into the path of Salah, he played the ball forwards, but as three defenders came to challenge him, with the outside of his left boot he placed his shot beyond Brad Friedel from 20 metres. The Basel keeper had more to do than his counterpart. Sommer beat away a curling effort from Mousa Dembélé and soon afterwards he held a shot from Emmanuel Adebayor. But as Friedel was called upon four minutes after the restart, he was only able to parry a flick-on from Fabian Schär following a corner-kick and Dragovic stood nearby and finished off from close range, to make amends for his mishap earlier. On 56 minutes following a long free-kick, he had a second chance, as he glanced his header goalward, but it flew narrowly wide. 72nd minute corner, Spurs were heading inwards, but Sommer stretched to push the ball away. On 81 minutes a long ball, out from the centre circle was well controlled and then hammered at goal by Dempsey, the ball was nearly parried by Sommer but it rolled home and levelled things again. Seconds before the final whistle Jan Vertonghen was shown a red card for bringing down Streller as last man and so Spurs went into extra time a man short. The home team were the more adventurous in these 30 minutes with an extra man. Mohamed Elneny had one drive from 25 metres out, which, however, rebounded from the woodwork and Alexander Frei had a number of good chances after coming on as a substitute. It came to the penalty shoot-out, Basel converted their first three attempts and keeper Sommer saved low to his right from Tom Huddlestone and Adebayor fired over the top. Marcelo Díaz hammered the decisive penalty into the net and Basel advanced to the semi-finals.

Chelsea (25 April 2013)
The draw for the semi-finals was held at UEFA headquarters in Nyon on 12 April and Basel were drawn against Chelsea. The first leg was played in the St. Jakob-Park with an attendance of 36,000 fans and was sold out. Both teams started well into the game. Basel were renowned for the early attacking pressure and therefore the Blues were ready. Basel's first corner of the game in the third minute was played short, Mohamed Elneny then crossed to the centre and the ball bounced behind from the cross-bar. Chelseas’ winger Eden Hazard played a pass through behind Park Joo Ho for César Azpilicueta, he sent in a good cross, but Frank Lampard's shot was  turned around the post by keeper Yann Sommer. From the corner that followed on 12 minutes the ball dropped beyond Branislav Ivanović and hit Moses in the face before bouncing into the corner of the net and the visitor's somewhat lucky, early lead. Hazard enjoyed two excellent chances, then Ramires sent in an angled shot forcing Sommer to make a one-handed stop. By the interval the hosts’ team had only really tested Petr Čech twice, first after a sharp and deflected free-kick from Fabian Schär that the goalie tipped over the bar, then he also had to pull off a low save from Mohamed Salah. Two minutes after the restart Valentin Stocker's shot, with Čech beaten, bounced back off the foot of the post and only minutes later at the other end Fernando Torres shot left-footed against the woodwork as well. The like-for-like trading of chances continued, Torres was denied by Sommer and then Marcelo Díaz swept his shot over the top from 12 metres out After 86 minutes Azpilicueta's foul on Stocker and referee was Pavel Královec of the Football Association of the Czech Republic rewarded the host a penalty which Schär converted for the equaliser. Entering into added time, Sommer made a miraculous save of captain John Terry's header, but he remained powerless to keep out David Luiz's last-gasp set piece in the fourth minute of added time that secured Chelsea a 2–1 victory.

Return match (2 May 2013)
The second leg was played at Stamford Bridge in London in front of an attendance of 39,403 fans. Both sides started well, but both missed early their chances. Basel's came as early as the first minute, but captain Marco Streller smashed his shot narrowly wide. At the other end Frank Lampard’s effort ricochet from the near post, then David Luiz missed his chance at the far post, another few minutes later Ramires, from close up, was beaten by Yann Sommer’s good reaction. Again at the other end, Mohamed Salah missed an opportunity in the 39th minute, as Petr Čech sprawled to smother it. However, the Egyptian forward threatened again before the break, fed by a good pass from Valentin Stocker, he dominantly hit the ball home. Moving into the second period Chelsea, with a second-half surge, scored three times within a ten-minute spell. First, a ball fell for Lampard, Sommer parried but was not able to hold the shot and Torres could not miss on 50 minutes. Then, double strike two minutes later. Victor Moses with a run down the right, pass to Torres, but his shot was blocked and the loose ball fell to Moses, who scored at the second attempt. Third, In the 59th minute Spurs’ next attack ended as Lampard teed up Luiz, who curled his first-time shot high into the net. Chelsea maintained defensive discipline, as Basel pressed, but Fabian Frei's shot rebounded from the woodwork and after this there were no more big chances. Referee Jonas Eriksson  from the Swedish Football Association blew the final whistle and Basel lost the match 1–3 and 2–5 on aggregate, thus Chelsea advanced to the final.

Conclusion
Chelsea thus advanced to the final, where they were matched against Benfica in the Amsterdam Arena and they won 2–1 to lift the trophy. From the Basel point of view, the team advancing to the semi-final and this meant that their aim had not just been met, but successfully surpassed. It was the first time that a Swiss team had advanced so far.

Players

First team squad 
The following is the list of the Basel first team squad. It also includes players that were in the squad the day the season started on 13 July 2012 but subsequently left the club after that date.

Out on loan

Transfers Summer 2012

In

Out

Transfers Winter 2012–13

In

Out

Results and fixtures

Legend

Friendly matches

Preseason

Winter break

Swiss Super League 

Kickoff times are in CET

First half of season

Second half of season

League table

Swiss Cup

UEFA Champions League

Qualifying rounds

Second qualifying round

Third qualifying round

Playoff round

UEFA Europa League

Group stage

Knockout phase

Round of 32

Basel won 3–1 on aggregate.

Round of 16

Basel won 2–1 on aggregate.

Quarter-finals

4–4 on aggregate. Basel won 4–1 on penalties.

Semi-finals

Chelsea won 5–2 on aggregate.

Statistics

Appearances and goals 

|-
! colspan="15" style="background:#dcdcdc; text-align:center"| Goalkeepers

|-
! colspan="15" style="background:#dcdcdc; text-align:center"| Defenders

|-
! colspan="15" style="background:#dcdcdc; text-align:center"| Midfielders

|-
! colspan="15" style="background:#dcdcdc; text-align:center"| Forwards

|-
|colspan="14"|Players away from the club on loan:

|-
|colspan="14"|Players who appeared for Basel no longer at the club:

See also
 History of FC Basel
 List of FC Basel players
 List of FC Basel seasons

References

Sources
 Rotblau: Jahrbuch Saison 2015/2016. Publisher: FC Basel Marketing AG. 
 Rotblau: Jahrbuch Saison 2017/2018. Publisher: FC Basel Marketing AG. 
 Die ersten 125 Jahre / 2018. Publisher: Josef Zindel im Friedrich Reinhardt Verlag, Basel. 
 Season 2012–13 at "Basler Fussballarchiv” homepage
 Switzerland 2012–12 at RSSSF

External links
 

Basel
Basel
FC Basel seasons
Basel
Swiss football championship-winning seasons